is a Japanese voice actress from Ōita Prefecture affiliated with Aoni Production.

Filmography

Anime television 
 Case Closed (Tivoli garden receptionist) (episode 377)
 Galaxy Fraulein Yuna (Mai Tokudaiji)
 Galaxy Fraulein Yuna Returns (Mai of Roppogni)
 Perfect Blue (Mima's mother)
 Sailor Moon (Phantom of the Lake) (episode 40)
 The Super Dimension Fortress Macross II: Lovers, Again (Saori)

Video games 
 Galaxy Fraulein Yuna series (Mai of Roppogni)
 Lunar: Silver Star Story (Lemia Ausa, Xenobia)
 Star Fox: Assault (Krystal)
 Super Smash Bros. Brawl (Krystal, Isaac)
 Super Smash Bros. Ultimate (Krystal, Isaac)

External links 
  
 

Living people
Voice actresses from Ōita Prefecture
Japanese video game actresses
Japanese voice actresses
Aoni Production voice actors
1968 births